Loganlea railway station is located on the Beenleigh line in Queensland, Australia. It serves the suburbs of Loganlea and Meadowbrook in Logan City. The station opened in 1885 at the same time as the line. On 21 April 1992, a second platform opened as part of the duplication of the line. It is within a short distance of the Logan Hospital, TAFE college, Griffith University Logan campus, Loganlea State High School and Woolworths supermarket.

History

In the past it was used to load freight for the distribution of timber and local produce.  It once had a goods shed.  The station was severely damaged by a cyclone in 1936. For some time trains of eight or nine carriages had stopping at Loganlea when its platform length could only cover two or three carriages.

In December 2019, the Queensland government announced the station would be moved to a new location  to the east, adjacent to Logan Hospital.

Services
Loganlea is served by all stops Beenleigh line services from Beenleigh to Bowen Hills and Ferny Grove.
It is also served by limited stops Gold Coast line services from Varsity Lakes to Bowen Hills, Doomben and Brisbane Airport.

Services by platform

Transport links
Logan City Bus Service operate two routes via Loganlea station:
560: Loganholme to Browns Plains
562: Loganholme to Beenleigh station

References

External links

Loganlea station Queensland Rail via the Wayback Machine (19 February 2015).
Loganlea station Queensland's Railways on the Internet
[ Loganlea station] TransLink travel information

Railway stations in Australia opened in 1885
Railway stations in Logan City